MZA refer to:

 Alias of the American entertainer Method Man
 Mayor Pnp Nancy Flore Airport (IATA code)
 Samples of identical twins who have been adopted by different households in an Adoption study